The European Under-21 Championships is an annual table tennis tournament organised under the authority of the European Table Tennis Union (ETTU). The introduction of the event to the table tennis calendar was approved at the ETTU Congress in 2015, with the first competition held in Sochi, Russia, in February 2017.

Editions

{| 
|

Champions

All time medal table

See also
European Table Tennis Championships
Table Tennis European Youth Championships
International Table Tennis Federation

References

External links
European Table Tennis Union

Table tennis competitions
Table tennis
Recurring sporting events established in 2017